James Walton (3 November 1898 – 26 August 1989) was an English professional footballer who played as a left half in the Football League for Leeds United, Brentford, Bristol Rovers and Hartlepools United.

Career statistics

References

People from Sacriston
Footballers from County Durham
Association football wing halves
English footballers
Cleator Moor Celtic F.C. players
West Stanley F.C. players
Leeds United F.C. players
Bristol Rovers F.C. players
Brentford F.C. players
Hartlepool United F.C. players
English Football League players
1898 births
1989 deaths